NH 122 may refer to:

 National Highway 122 (India)
 New Hampshire Route 122, United States